Matías Rodrigo Campos López (born August 18, 1991), usually known as Matías Campos López, is a Chilean footballer who plays for Primera División de Chile side Everton on loan from Universidad de Chile.

Personal life
He is usually named by his two last names, Campos López, to make a difference with his namesake Matías Campos Toro. Both players were with Audax Italiano in his early career and played for Universidad de Chile.

Honours

Club
Palestino
 Copa Chile (1): 2018

References

External links
 
 

1991 births
Living people
People from Santiago
Chilean footballers
Audax Italiano footballers
Deportes Iberia footballers
San Luis de Quillota footballers
Unión San Felipe footballers
Deportes Temuco footballers
Rangers de Talca footballers
San Marcos de Arica footballers
Club Deportivo Palestino footballers
Universidad de Chile footballers
Everton de Viña del Mar footballers
Chilean Primera División players
Segunda División Profesional de Chile players
Primera B de Chile players
Association football forwards
Footballers from Santiago